The Australian cricket team toured the West Indies in the 1972–73 season to play a five-match Test series against the West Indies. Australia won the series 2–0 with three matches drawn.  Australia therefore kept the Sir Frank Worrell Trophy.

Australian squad
The original squad selected were as follows:
Batsmen – Ian Chappell (captain), Greg Chappell, Keith Stackpole, Doug Walters, John Benaud, Ian Redpath, Ross Edwards
Fastbowlers – Dennis Lillee, Jeff Hammond, Max Walker, Bob Massie
Spinners – Kerry O'Keeffe, Terry Jenner, John Watkins
Wicketkeeper – Rod Marsh

Test matches
Dennis Lillee became injured during the tour and Bob Massie lost form. However the other Australian bowlers performed admirably and Australia wound up winning the series comfortably.. Henry Blofeld later wrote in Wisden:
It hardly seemed possible for Australia to win a series in the West Indies without any contribution from Lillee and Massie who had developed into such a formidable combination against England a few months earlier, and without the services of Mallett, their off spinner, who was unavailable for the tour. In spite of all this Ian Chappell's side won impressively, beating the West Indies in the third and fourth Test matches at Port of Spain and Georgetown respectively. Australia won as much as anything because of the strength and the nature of their temperament which both collectively and individually refuses to accept defeat until it has become a fact. On the other hand it was the temperamental deficiencies of the West Indies players which contributed more to their defeat than any technical inadequacies.

Test series summary

First Test

Second Test

Third Test

Fourth Test

Fifth Test

References

External links
Australian cricket team in West Indies in 1972–73 at Cricinfo

1973 in Australian cricket
1972–73
West Indian cricket seasons from 1970–71 to 1999–2000
International cricket competitions from 1970–71 to 1975
1973 in West Indian cricket